Susya is a religious communal Israeli settlement in Area C of the West Bank. Located near but not atop the ancient Jewish village and synagogue in the archaeological site of Susya, it falls under the jurisdiction of Har Hevron Regional Council. In  it had a population of 

The international community considers Israeli settlements in the West Bank illegal under international law, but the Israeli government disputes this.

History

An Israeli settlement was established in the area of Susya between May and September 1983, on 1,800 dunams of land. It was expanded in late 1999 by installing 10 caravans on 4 dunams of land belonging to the Shreiteh family. It had a population of 737 in 2006. In 1985, the Susya Tourism and Education Center was established which offers tours and activities in the nearby archaeological site. The center has a hostel and a pool.

In 2008, a large advanced goat pen and dairy, incorporated as Halav Ha'aretz, Susya Dairy Ltd., was inaugurated on Susya's lands with an investment of 3.5 million ILS. It produced goat yoghurt for the Israeli market from a herd of 1500 goats, 48 of which can be milked simultaneously.

Many former Afrikaner Christians, after converting to Judaism, have settled in Susya, which has become a notable stronghold for their group.

Israeli-Palestinian conflict
On 23 March 1993, Musa Suliman Abu Sabha, a Palestinian was arrested outside Susiya by two guards, Moshe Deutsch and Yair Har-Sinai, because they suspected he was planning an attack on Jews. Taken for questioning, he stabbed in the shoulder or back one of the guards, Moshe Deutsch, while the two were in a car, and, wrestled to the ground, was bound hand and foot. Another settler from nearby Maal Hever, Yoram Shkolnik shot him eight times, killing him. According to the IDF he was found bearing a grenade, although the Baltimore Sun attributed assertions that, "the grenade had previously been removed from him" to unspecified "other sources. Shkolnik was arrested and served seven and a half years in prison for murder.

On 2 July 2001, the body of Yair Har-Sinai, a Jewish shepherd of 19 years from Susya who advocated pacifism was found shot in the head and chest by Muhammad Noor from nearby Khirbet Susya.

One of three victims of the Fatah Al-Aqsa Martyrs' Brigades' Gush Etzion attack on October 16, 2005, a fifteen-year-old boy named Oz Ben-Meir (from Ma'on) is buried in the Susya Jewish cemetery in the southeastern portion of the settlement across Road 317 from the main housing section of this settlement. A friend and he were on their way to visit Jerusalem when he was killed. According to the media, thousands attended his funeral and burial.

References

Populated places established in 1983
Religious Israeli settlements
1983 establishments in the Palestinian territories
Community settlements
Israeli settlements in the West Bank